The 2017 Malaysia Cup Final was a football match which were played on 4 November 2017, to determine the champion of the 2017 Malaysia Cup. It was the final of the 91st edition of the Malaysia Cup, competition organised by the Football Association of Malaysia.

It was played at the Shah Alam Stadium, in Shah Alam, Selangor, between Kedah and Johor Darul Ta'zim. Johor Darul Ta'zim won the match 2–0 to secure their first title in this competition. The defending champions Kedah, have successfully reach the final for the third time in a row (2015, 2016, 2017). However, Kedah lost this year, for eight time in thirteen finals reached.

Venue

Shah Alam Stadium was announced as the final venue on 4 November 2017, following the decision of the Football Malaysia Limited Liability Partnership (FMLLP) on 12 September 2017, after the Bukit Jalil National Stadium had already been booked for another event.

Road to final

Note: In all results below, the score of the finalist is given first.

Match details

Statistics

See also

2017 Malaysia FA Cup Final

References

External links
FAM Official website

Malaysia Cup seasons
2017 in Malaysian football